Square up may refer to:

 Square Up, a 2018 album by South Korean girl group Blackpink
 Square-up, a title card at the start of an exploitation film
 Square up (baseball), to hit a ball near its center
 squareup.com, the website of financial services platform Square